The Charles Ward Engineering Works, Charleston, W. Va. was an iron and steel fabricator and shipyard founded by Charles Ward in 1872. They produced shallow draught boats at a plant on the south bank of the Kanawha River.  It remained in operation until 1931 headed by the founder’s son Charles E. Ward.

Ward designed and built many steam and diesel powered vessels, both paddlewheel and propeller driven.  Customers include the Army, Navy and Coast Guard.
 
Ward manufactured water-tube boilers in many sizes.  The firm also pioneered the development of the tunnel stern propeller driven towboats and were among the first companies to install diesel power in river towboats.

Notable vessels built by Charles Ward Engineering Works
P.A. Denny stern wheel towboat 1930
  US Army harbor ferry 1922
 US Army harbor ferry 1921
 Coast Guard river tender 1924

See also
Riverboat
Towboat

References
 West Virginina state archives Manuscript Collections  - Ward Engineering Works Collection, 1915-1930
Guide to the Records of the Ward Engineering Company: Maritime Innovators of Charleston, West Virginia, D. C. Cebula, Michael R. Ridderbusch West Virginia and Regional History Collection, 2006
Charles Ward and the James Rumsey: Regional Innovation in Steam Technology on the Western Rivers, by Parkinson, George P. Jr. and Brooks F. McCabe Jr., West Virginia History (magazine) Vol. 39, Nos. 2 & 3, 1978 January-April
Shipbuilding History: Charles Ward Engineering, Charleston WV 
The History of West Virginia, Old and New, by James Morton Callahan, American Historical Society, 1923
Steamboats.org Short history of Charles Ward Engineering

Paddle steamers
American naval architects
Charleston, West Virginia
Marine engine manufacturers